Nissenson is a surname. Notable people with the surname include:

Hugh Nissenson (1933–2013), American author
Jack Nissenson (1933–2015), Canadian folk musician
Mary Nissenson (1952–2017), American television journalist, entrepreneur, social activist, and university instructor